ORACLE (from "Optional Reception of Announcements by Coded Line Electronics") was a commercial teletext service first broadcast on the ITV network in 1978 and later additionally on Channel 4 in the United Kingdom from 1982. The service ceased on both channels at 23:59 UTC on 31 December 1992, when it was replaced by Teletext Ltd.

History
It was developed and launched by the Independent Broadcasting Authority's engineering division, about 4 years after BBC's Ceefax service. Due to the lack of available receivers, exact launch dates have been left obscure. Receivers became popular around the early 1980s.

In Britain ORACLE, ITV's teletext service, was launched as a new advertising medium on 1 September 1981 with 180,000 teletext sets in the country. By the following year there were then 450,000 sets in the UK and that number was projected to rise to nearly three million at the end of 1985 and confident predictions of advertising revenues as high as $90 million (£50 million).

ORACLE moved away from being an experimental engineering department and more towards being a content provider. Under the original plans for the ITV franchise renewal, they were to have been scrapped at the end of 1992 and the few scan lines they used given to the highest bidder. ORACLE successfully campaigned for the creation of a franchise for the teletext service on ITV and Channel 4, only to find themselves outbid by Teletext Ltd., a consortium originally comprising Associated Newspapers, Koninklijke Philips Electronics N.V. and Media Ventures International, who started broadcasting at midnight on New Year's Day 1993.

In-vision broadcasts
From early 1983 until its demise on 31st December 1992, ORACLE pages were broadcast in vision during downtime, mostly on Channel 4, although occasionally pages were shown during the night on ITV.

Channel 4

4-Tel on View
Shown between 1983 and January 1997, 4-Tel on View was a magazine featuring previews of the day’s Channel 4’s programmes as well as back-up information and other features, such as the adventures of a dog called 4-T, from Channel 4's own "4-Tel" teletext service. The transmissions were especially notable from 1986 when animated graphics were introduced. Although the service was transmitted alongside Oracle on Channel 4, 4-Tel was editorially and legally separate, and operated for Channel 4 by Intelfax Ltd. 

From 1983 until the start of Channel 4's breakfast television service in April 1989, the 4-Tel magazine ran for 15 minutes and was repeated several times each day with transmissions airing at increasingly earlier times of the day as Channel 4 expanded its broadcast hours. Following the start of breakfast television, however, 4-Tel on View was shown in a single block, initially 40 minutes in length, before the start of programmes. After ORACLE lost its franchise on 31 December 1992, 4-Tel on View continued to be shown and from 1 January 1993 until Channel 4 started 24-hour broadcasting in January 1997, 4-Tel on View was generally shown throughout Channel 4’s entire closedown period.

Oracle on View
Between 1983 and 1989, Channel 4 broadcast pages from the ORACLE service on air. Shown in 15 minute bursts, and alternating with 4-Tel on View and showings of the ETP-1 testcard, the pages were seen during the day when Channel 4 was not broadcasting actual programmes. Initially, the pages shown were from one aspect of the ORACLE service with the subject matter changing every so often. In September 1987, Oracle on View became a news service, adopting this format at the same time that Channel 4 expanded its broadcast hours to accommodate the transfer of ITV Schools to Channel 4. Oracle on View ended on 31 March 1989, three days before Channel 4 started broadcasting breakfast television.

ITV

Jobfinder
During the late 1980s and mid 1990s, many ITV companies broadcast job vacancies and related information during overnight periods and the service was provided by broadcasting the relevant ORACLE page in-vision. Central was the first company to do this, beginning in April 1986, with Yorkshire following in January 1987. Initially the pages were broadcast for an hour after the end of regular programming but from April 1987 Central broadcast Jobfinder throughout their overnight downtime with Tyne Tees doing the same from November 1987. By late 1988, all of ITV was broadcasting a 24-hour service and many other companies, including Granada, HTV and TSW, introduced their own Jobfinder service at this point, broadcasting the pages between 4am and 5am, later 4:30am to 5:30am. By the late 1990s the vacancies were no longer transmitted in a teletext format and by the mid-2000s all of the Jobfinder services had ended, with Yorkshire being the last.

Daybreak
For a short period in 1987, prior to the start of 24-hour broadcasting on ITV, a selection of teletext pages were broadcast in-vision prior to the start of TV-am. These pages mostly consisted of news and information about TV-am.

The end

 
ORACLE began to disappear at 23:31:09 on 31 December 1992, with the outer border of pixels turning black. This process continued until 23:55:55 when only a white square was left, with the text ORACLE gone 1978-1992. It was then replaced by the service from Teletext Ltd. ORACLE did not carry television listings beyond its midnight closing time on New Year's Eve 1992. It merely stated "00.00 THE END OF ORACLE: NOW THE NIGHTMARE BEGINS!".

Additional images

See also
Park Avenue, a teletext based soap which appeared on ORACLE for several years written by Robbie Burns and Steve Regan.
Timeline of teletext in the UK

References

External links
Information and screenshots of Oracle from mb21
Debbie's Diary: "a bit like Belle de Jour but without the sauce" (The Guardian) 
A full capture of Oracle from the last day of service.

ITV franchisees
Teletext
1978 in British television
History of telecommunications in the United Kingdom